Hawaii is a state in the Western United States located in the Pacific Ocean about  from the U.S. mainland. Since its admission to the Union in August 1959, it has participated in 16 United States presidential elections. In the 1960 presidential election, Hawaii was narrowly won by the Democratic Party's candidate John F. Kennedy, defeating the Republican Party's candidate and incumbent vice president Richard Nixon by a margin of just 0.06% (115 votes). In the 1964 presidential election, the Democratic Party's candidate Lyndon B. Johnson won Hawaii by a margin of 57.52%, which remains the largest ever margin of victory in the state's history. Since the 1960 election, Hawaii has been won by the Democratic Party in every presidential election, except in 1972 and 1984, which were both won in a national Republican landslide victory by Nixon and Ronald Reagan respectively.

In the 1992 presidential election, the independent candidate Ross Perot received the highest percentage of vote share (14.22%) ever won by a third party candidate in Hawaii. In the 2016 presidential election, a faithless elector pledged to the Democratic Party instead voted for Bernie Sanders for president and Elizabeth Warren for vice president. Subsequently, the Democratic ticket of Hillary Clinton and Tim Kaine received only three electoral votes from Hawaii. Gallup Poll has ranked Hawaii in the top ten most Democratic states. As of 2020, no Republican has ever carried the state in two consecutive elections since Nixon and Reagan only won it in their 1972 and 1984 re-election bids, Democrats, however have carried the state in consecutive elections.

Hawaii is a signatory of the National Popular Vote Interstate Compact, an interstate compact in which signatories award all of their electoral votes to the winner of the national-level popular vote in a presidential election, even if another candidate won an individual signatory's popular vote.  it has not yet gone into force.

Presidential elections

Graph

See also
 Elections in Hawaii
 List of United States presidential election results by state

Notes

References

Works cited